Gardner-Rasheed feline sarcoma viral (v-fgr) oncogene homolog, also known as FGR, is a protein which in humans is encoded by the FGR gene.

Function 

This gene is a member of the Src family of protein tyrosine kinases (PTKs). The encoded protein contains N-terminal sites for myristoylation and palmitoylation, a PTK domain, and SH2 and SH3 domains which are involved in mediating protein-protein interactions with phosphotyrosine-containing and proline-rich motifs, respectively. The protein localizes to plasma membrane ruffles, and functions as a negative regulator of cell migration and adhesion triggered by the beta-2 integrin signal transduction pathway. Infection with Epstein–Barr virus results in the overexpression of this gene. Multiple alternatively spliced variants, encoding the same protein, have been identified.

Discovery  

The feline version of this gene was discovered by Suraiya Rasheed, Murray Gardner, and co-workers.

Interactions 

FGR (gene) has been shown to interact with Wiskott–Aldrich syndrome protein.

References

Further reading 

 
 
 
 
 
 
 
 
 
 
 
 
 
 
 
 
 
 
 

Tyrosine kinases